Inopsis scylla is a moth of the family Erebidae. It was described by Herbert Druce in 1885. It is found in Panama.

References

 

Lithosiina
Moths described in 1885